Callum Field (born 7 October 1997) is an English professional rugby league footballer who plays as a  forward or  for Widnes Vikings in the Betfred Championship.

Background
Field was born in Pontefract, West Yorkshire, England.

Career

Wigan Warriors
He has previously played for the Wigan Warriors in the Super League and spent time on loan from Wigan at the Swinton Lions and the Dewsbury Rams in the Championship, and the London Skolars in Betfred League 1.

In 2017 he made his professional début for the Swinton Lions against the London Broncos.

Leigh Centurions
On 5 November 2019 it was announced that Field would join Leigh Centurions.

Featherstone Rovers
In December 2020 it was announced that Field had signed for Featherstone Rovers for the 2021 season.

Widnes Vikings
On 9 May 2022 it was announced that Field had signed for Widnes Vikings on-loan for the 2022 season In October 2022 he signed a two-year deal with the club.

References

External links
Wigan Warriors U19 profile
 Wigan Warriors profile
SL profile

1997 births
Living people
Dewsbury Rams players
English rugby league players
Featherstone Rovers players
Leigh Leopards players
London Skolars players
Newcastle Thunder players
Rugby league centres
Rugby league players from Pontefract
Rugby league second-rows
Swinton Lions players
Widnes Vikings players
Wigan Warriors players